Esenyurt (literally "healthy homeland" or "windy homeland") is a Turkish place name that may refer to:

 Esenyurt, a district of Istanbul Province and part of the metropolitan municipality of the city of Istanbul, Turkey
 Esenyurt, Bartın, a village in the district of Bartın, Bartın Province, Turkey
 Esenyurt, Çaycuma
 Esenyurt, Korkuteli, a village in the district of Korkuteli, Antalya Province, Turkey
 Esenyurt, Pazaryolu
 Esenyurt, Şenkaya
 Esenyurt, Üzümlü
 Esenyurt, Vezirköprü, a village in the district of Vezirköprü, Samsun Province, Turkey